Dunlap Creek  is a stream in Hickman County, Tennessee, in the United States. It is a tributary of Duck River.

Dunlap Creek was named for Robert Dunlap, a pioneer who settled at the creek in 1810.

See also
List of rivers of Tennessee

References

Rivers of Hickman County, Tennessee
Rivers of Tennessee